Svengali is a 1954 British drama film directed by Noel Langley and starring Hildegard Knef, Donald Wolfit and Terence Morgan. Svengali hypnotises an artist's model into becoming a great opera singer, but she struggles to escape from his powers. It was based on the 1894 novel Trilby by George du Maurier. The film was made at Walton Studios near London with sets designed by the art director Frederick Pusey and costumes by Beatrice Dawson. It was shot in Eastmancolor. It was picked up for distribution in the United States by Metro-Goldwyn-Mayer.

Donald Wolfit was a last-minute replacement for actor Robert Newton, who left three weeks into filming and can still be seen in some long shots. Amongst the end credits is the acknowledgement: "The producer expresses his grateful appreciation for the magnificent singing voice of Madame Elizabeth Schwarzkopf."

Synopsis
After being fired from working as a barmaid in Paris bar, Trilby O'Ferrall is hired by the sculptor Durian as a model. She encounters three British painters living next door, including the sensitive Billy Bagot with whom she gradually falls in love. She also encounters the street musician Svengali, but does not much like him. Billy wants to marry Trilby, but his wealthy family do not approve. He is also distressed when he discovers her posing nude for a class of art students. He is knocked down in the street by a carriage and suffers from ill health, returning to London.

In the meantime, Svengali takes control of Trilby's life, after he is able to cure her of a headache. Despite the fact that previously she has only been able to badly sing the parlour song "Alice, Where Art Thou?" which she learnt from her Irish father, he now coaches her and transforms her into a magnificent opera singer by his mesmerising technique. She becomes an international success, performing in capitals across Europe and led by the domineering Svengali she forgets Billy completely. However, when he attends a performance of hers in London, the spell is shattered and instead of performing classical opera to the expectant crowd she sings "Alice, Where Are Thou?" in her old voice.

Cast 

 Hildegard Knef as  Trilby O'Ferrall
 Donald Wolfit as  Svengali
 Terence Morgan as  Billy Bagot
 Derek Bond as  The Laird
 Paul Rogers as  Taffy
 David Kossoff as  Gecko
 Hubert Gregg as  Durian
 Noel Purcell as  Patrick O'Ferrall
 Alfie Bass as  Carrell
 Harry Secombe as  Barizel
 Peter Illing as Police Inspector
 Joan Haythorne as Mrs. Bagot
 Hugh Cross as Dubose
 David Oxley as Dodor
 Richard Pearson as Lambert
 Michael Craig as  Zouzou
 Arnold Bell as Tout 
 Martin Boddey as Doctor 
 Neville Phillips as 	Contran
 Rica Fox as 	Dresser 
 Toots Pounds as 	Mama Martin
 Joan Heal as 	Barmaid
 Cyril Smith as 1st Stage Manager 
 Marne Maitland as 2nd Stage Manager 
 Jeremy Brett as 	Pierre 
 Michael Hordern as 	Billy's Uncle
 Aileen Lewis as 	Covent Garden Patron
 Elisabeth Schwarzkopf as Trilby O'Ferrall (singing voice)

Critical reception 
Under the heading, "Sixth Filming of Novel Fails to Hypnotize", The New York Times critic described the film as "a stylized curio that seems out of place in the atomic age...as old-fashioned as side whiskers and bustles".

DVD Talk, comparing it to the 1931 John Barrymore version posited that "the 1954 British film fleshes out the characters of Trilby and Billy considerably and adds a lot of color and subtlety, but the results suggest that a more flamboyant approach might have worked better than the lush but tame version that resulted. The Eastmancolor production aims for an evocative atmosphere akin to John Huston's gorgeous Moulin Rouge (1952), photographed in Technicolor by Oswald Morris. Svengali was made on a fraction of that film's budget, though does look handsome for what it is."

References

External links 

 

1954 films
1954 drama films
British drama films
Films based on British novels
Films based on works by George du Maurier
Films about hypnosis
Films scored by William Alwyn
Trilby (novel)
Films with screenplays by Noel Langley
Films directed by Noel Langley
Films shot at Nettlefold Studios
Metro-Goldwyn-Mayer films
Films set in Paris
Films set in the 1890s
British historical films
1950s historical films
1950s English-language films
1950s British films